Kuch Khatti Kuch Meethi is a 2001 Indian film directed by Rahul Rawail and starring Kajol in a double role as two estranged identical twins.The film also stars Sunil Shetty, Rishi Kapoor, Rati Agnihotri and  Pooja Batra.

Plot
Raj Khanna is a wealthy and eligible businessman who is married to Archana. Since Raj’s evil step sister Devyani wants his wealth, she informs Raj that his wife is having an affair with another person. They both decide to separate. Shortly before separating she gives birth to twins, one of which is taken away from her and given to Raj. Sweety grows up with her father. On the other hand Archana shifts to London with the other twin named Tina (Kajol). Sweety refuses to marry the man of her father’s choice and runs away to London. The twins meet through a series of coincidences and decides to switch places. Both the twin sisters decide to reunite their family again. When Tina meets Raj she finds out that he is having an affair with Savitri (Pooja Batra). Tina’s boyfriend Samir also helps both the twins to unite their parents. In the end Raj and Archana finally meet and they consider living together again.

Cast
Rishi Kapoor as Raj Khanna
 Rati Agnihotri as Archana Khanna
 Parmeet Sethi as Ranjeet Ahuja
 Kajol as Tina Khanna Mother and Twins Daughter Sweety Anjali Khanna - Raj and Archana's twin daughters 
 Sunil Shetty as Sameer 
 Mita Vasisht as Devyani
 Razzak Khan as Balu
 Pooja Batra as Savitri
 Pramod Moutho as Doctor
 Dinesh Hingoo as Sweety Anjali's prospective father-in-law

Soundtrack
The film soundtrack contains 8 songs composed by Anu Malik and lyrics penned by Sameer.

  "Ab Nahi To Kab": Anu Malik & Sunidhi Chauhan
  "Band Kamre Mein": Anuradha Sriram
  "Khud Bhi Nachungi": Alka Yagnik
  "Kuch Kuch Khatti": Alka Yagnik
  "Neend Udh Rahi Hai": Alka Yagnik & Kumar Sanu
  "Saamne Baith Kar": Alka Yagnik & Kumar Sanu
  "Tumko Sirf Tumko I": Kumar Sanu& Alka Yagnik
  "Tumko Sirf Tumko II": Kumar Sanu

Reception
Suman Tarafdar of Filmfare rated the film two stars and gave a critical review of both the film and Kajol's performance. According to critic Arati Koppar, writing for the same publication), the film's ending was borrowed from "some low-budget" Telugu-language films. Savera R Someshwar of Rediff.com stated ″Most films have their moments. This one, sadly, doesn't. Everything is forced. There is not one moment in the film that I could call funny, or touching. Or anything. The twins meeting each other for the first time -- thanda [cold]. The parent-child reunion scenes -- thanda.

Taran Adarsh of IndiaFM rated the film 2/5, writing "On the whole, KUCH KHATTI KUCH MEETHI is a welcome change from the usual bang, bang, shoot'em up flicks produced in the recent times. The film has its share of flaws, but the fact cannot be ruled out that it is a feel-good film. The film has a genuine buoyancy that leaves a viewer happy."

References

External links
 

2001 films
Films based on Lottie and Lisa
2000s Hindi-language films
2001 drama films
Twins in Indian films
Films directed by Rahul Rawail
Indian drama films
Films scored by Anu Malik
Hindi-language drama films